SM U-49 was the seventh U-boat of the U-43 class. She was ordered on 4 August 1914 and was put into the III Flotilla 7 August 1916. None was a naval ship.

Kapitänleutnant Richard Hartmann commanded U-49 throughout her career until she was sunk on 11 September 1917 in action in the Bay of Biscay. While surfaced, U-49 attacked the merchant ship , which had sailed Brest, France bound for Archangel in Russia, laden with munitions and other explosives. After a gun battle lasting five hours, U-49 fired two torpedoes at British Transport.

It was the first time in the war that a merchant ship had sunk a U-boat. In February 1918 British Transports Master, Captain AT Pope, was made a Companion of the Distinguished Service Order, three of her officers were awarded the DSC, seven of her crewmen were awarded the DSM and three were mentioned in dispatches.

Summary of raiding history

References

Notes

Citations

Bibliography

Type U 43 submarines
Ships built in Danzig
1915 ships
U-boats commissioned in 1916
World War I submarines of Germany
Maritime incidents in 1917
U-boats sunk in 1917
U-boats sunk by British warships
Ships lost with all hands
Shipwrecks in the Bay of Biscay
World War I shipwrecks in the Atlantic Ocean